Straumshamn is a village in Volda Municipality in Møre og Romsdal county, Norway. The village is located at the southern end of the Kilsfjorden branch of the Voldsfjorden. The Bjørkedalen valley runs south from Straumshamn cutting between the Sunnmørsalpene mountains. Kilsfjord Church is located in Straumshamn.

References

Villages in Møre og Romsdal
Volda